Phillip Stephen Busbridge (4 September 1920 – 11 December 1975) was an Australian rules footballer who played with Collingwood in the Victorian Football League (VFL). 

He also served in the Royal Australian Air Force during World War II.

Notes

External links 

Profile on Collingwood Forever		

		
1920 births		
1975 deaths	
Australian rules footballers from Melbourne
Collingwood Football Club players
Royal Australian Air Force personnel of World War II
Royal Australian Air Force airmen
People from Brunswick, Victoria
Military personnel from Melbourne